Società Italiana Acciaierie Cornigliano (SIAC) was an Italian steelworks company.

History

It was established in 1934 to group the Ansaldo steelworks - started up in 1898 and centered on the Genoa Campi plant.

In the same year the company passed under the control of the Istituto per la Ricostruzione Industriale (IRI).

In 1938 the entire stock package was held by Finsider.

In 1939 the SIAC started the construction of the Genoa Cornigliano plant that, after the destruction of the Second World War, was dedicated to Oscar Sinigaglia.

In 1951 the SIAC entrusted the reconstruction and expansion of the Oscar Sinigaglia plant to Cornigliano Società per Costruzione Impianti Industriali (founded by Finsider in 1948), which will take over the name of Cornigliano S.p.A.

On April 14, 1951, for expanding the plant, the Castle Raggio was demolished, which was already heavily damaged by the bombings of the Second World War.

Finally, in 1962, SIAC entrusted the management of the Genoa Campi plant to Italsider Alti Forni and Acciaierie Riunite Ilva and Cornigliano.

In 1967 the company was incorporated into Italsider.

See also
 Steel industry in Italy
 ILVA

References

Industry in Italy
Steel companies of Italy